MUSA (Music of the United States of America) is a forty-volume series of critical editions of American music, representing the full range of genres and idioms that have contributed to American musical culture. 

It was established by the American Musicological Society in 1988 and is hosted by the University of Michigan at its American Music Institute. The criteria used in developing MUSA volumes are:
That the series as a whole reflect breadth and balance among eras, genres, composers and performance media
That it avoid music already available through other channels, duplicating only where new editions of available music seem essential
That works in the series be representative, chosen to reflect particular excellence or to represent notable achievements in this country's highly varied music history 
MUSA receives funding from the National Endowment for the Humanities and is published by A-R Editions of Madison, Wisconsin. The founding editor-in-chief of MUSA is Richard Crawford, and the current editors-in-chief are Mark Clague (University of Michigan) and Gayle Magee (University of Illinois, Urbana-Champaign).

Publications 

MUSA 1: Music for Small Orchestra (1926); Suite No. 2 for Four Strings and Piano (1929) by Ruth Crawford
MUSA 2: Early Songs, 1907–1914 by Irving Berlin
MUSA 3: Quartet for Strings (In One Movement), Opus 89 by Amy Beach
MUSA 4: Collected Works by Daniel Read
MUSA 5: The Music and Scripts of In Dahomey by Will Marion Cook and Paul Laurence Dunbar and others
MUSA 6: Psalmody and Secular Songs by Timothy Swan
MUSA 7: Collected Songs, 1873-1896 by Harrigan and Braham
MUSA 8: Keyboard and Chamber Music, 1937–1994 by Lou Harrison
MUSA 9: Barstow – Eight Hitchhiker Inscriptions from a Highway Railing at Barstow, California (1968 Version) by Harry Partch
MUSA 10: Performances in Transcription, 1927–1943 based on recordings by Thomas Wright "Fats" Waller
MUSA 11: Writing American Indian Music: Historic Transcriptions, Notations, and Arrangements
MUSA 12: 129 Songs by Charles Ives
MUSA 13: Quintette for Piano and String Quartet by Leo Ornstein
MUSA 14: American Victorian Choral Music by Dudley Buck
MUSA 15: Selected Piano Solos, 1928–1941 based on recordings by Earl "Fatha" Hines
MUSA 16: Complete Wind Chamber Music by David Moritz Michael
MUSA 17: Surviving Orchestral Music by Charles Hommann
MUSA 18: Four Saints in Three Acts by Virgil Thomson and Gertrude Stein
MUSA 19: Symphonies Nos. 1 and 3 by Florence Price
MUSA 20: Songs from "A New Circle of Voices": The Sixteenth Annual Pow-Wow at UCLA
MUSA 21: Six Marches by John Philip Sousa
MUSA 22: The Ingalls Wilder Family Songbook
MUSA 23: Symphony no. 2 in D minor, op. 24 ("Jullien") by George Frederick Bristow
MUSA 24: Sam Morgan's Jazz Band: Complete Recorded Works in Transcription based on recordings by Sam Morgan
MUSA 25: Selected Works for Big Band, by Mary Lou Williams
MUSA 26: Machito and His Afro-Cubans: Selected Transcriptions by Machito
MUSA 27: Di goldene kale (1923) by Joseph Rumshinsky
MUSA 28: The Padrone by George Whitefield Chadwick
MUSA 29: Shuffle Along (1921) by Eubie Blake and Noble Sissle

References

External links 
Official website
Music of the United States of America at A-R Editions

Music books
Collected editions of classical composers